The Made Men was an American rap group signed to Restless Records composed of former Almighty RSO members Benzino and Antonio Twice Thou (formally E-Devious), and Cool Gsus. The group first appeared on DJ Clue's debut album, The Professional on the self-titled track, "Made Men". They then issued their debut album Classic Limited Edition on August 24, 1999, but the album failed to meet expectations, only making it to 61 on the Billboard 200. Although they never released a follow-up, the group continued to make guest appearances on albums by other artists and soundtracks. They last appeared on Daz Dillinger's Who Ride wit Us: Tha Compalation, Vol. 1 in 2001.

Discography

Studio albums

American hip hop groups
Musical groups from Boston
Hardcore hip hop groups